Aellen is a surname. Notable people with the surname include:

 Richard Aellen, American novelist and playwright
 Paul Aellen (1896–1973), Swiss botanist